Sestrimo Glacier is the 11 km long and 4 km wide glacier on the northwest side of Trinity Peninsula in Graham Land on the Antarctic Peninsula.  Situated southwest of Ogoya Glacier, west-northwest of Broad Valley and north of Cugnot Ice Piedmont.  Draining the north slopes of Windy Gap, and flowing northwards east of Mount D'Urville and west of Argentino (Guerrero) Peak to enter Lafond Bay in Bransfield Strait south of Cockerell Peninsula.

The glacier is named after the settlement of Sestrimo in southern Bulgaria.

Location
British-German mapping in 1996.

See also
 List of glaciers in the Antarctic
 Glaciology

Maps
 Trinity Peninsula. Scale 1:250000 topographic map No. 5697. Institut für Angewandte Geodäsie and British Antarctic Survey, 1996.
 Antarctic Digital Database (ADD). Scale 1:250000 topographic map of Antarctica. Scientific Committee on Antarctic Research (SCAR). Since 1993, regularly updated.

References
 Sestrimo Glacier SCAR Composite Gazetteer of Antarctica
 Bulgarian Antarctic Gazetteer. Antarctic Place-names Commission. (details in Bulgarian, basic data in English)

External links
 Sestrimo Glacier. Copernix satellite image

Glaciers of Trinity Peninsula
Bulgaria and the Antarctic